Chris Latham (born 8 September 1975) is a former Australian rugby union player who enjoyed a distinguished representative career with the Wests Bulldogs,  Queensland Reds and Australia between 1998 and 2007 before signing with Worcester Warriors in the UK and later Japanese club Kyuden Voltex.

He was the head coach for the Utah Warriors for the 2020 Major League Rugby season.

He stands as the second highest try scorer in Wallaby history with 40 international tries, only bettered by David Campese.

Career 
Latham began his Super Rugby career with the New South Wales Waratahs before a move to the Queensland Reds in 1998 saw him cement his place as a starting No. 15. He went on to become the first player to win the Australian Super Rugby Player of the Year award four times (2000, 2003, 2004, 2005).

Latham made his international debut against France on the 1998 Spring Tour and represented the Wallabies at three Rugby World Cups (1999, 2003 and 2007). At the 2003 tournament, he racked up an Australian record five-try haul against Namibia in Adelaide.

At the Northern Hemisphere v Southern Hemisphere Tsunami Relief match held at Twickenham in March 2005, he scored two tries and was named man of the match.

The following March, he represented the Australian Rugby Sevens team at the 2006 Commonwealth Games in Melbourne, but his campaign was cut short when he suffered a rib injury.

On 12 September 2006, he became the first backline player to be awarded the John Eales Medal and was later nominated by the International Rugby Board for Player of the Year, edged out for the award by New Zealand's Richie McCaw.

Latham suffered misfortune in early 2007 when he tore his anterior cruciate ligament in pre-season training with the Queensland Reds but managed to return for his third Rugby World Cup in October that year.

After a frustrating end to 2007 and start to the 2008 Super Rugby season where he battled a knee injury his representative career in Australia came to an untimely close in his return match against the Crusaders. In what should have been his penultimate appearance for the Queensland Reds, he ruptured his pectoral muscle 13 minutes into the game, drawing an end to his playing days on Australian soil as he'd already announced a move to Worcester for the following two seasons. The contract was estimated to be worth £325,000 a year, which would have made him the second highest wage earner in the English Premiership (Newcastle Falcons prop Carl Hayman tops the list)

After leaving Worcester, he joined Kyuden Voltex, a second-division club in Japan, on a two-year contract. He was also involved in skills training and backs coaching at Kyuden, and helped them win promotion to the top division for 2012–13 before retiring in 2012.

Stephen Jones, chief rugby correspondent for The Times and The Sunday Times, rated Latham as the finest fullback he has ever seen.

References

External links 
 Chris Latham Wallabies profile
 Chris Latham Reds profile
 Chris Latham Worcester Warriors profile
 Chris Latham 2006 Commonwealth Games Athlete

Australian rugby union coaches
Australian rugby union players
Australia international rugby union players
Australian expatriate sportspeople in England
New South Wales Waratahs players
Queensland Reds players
Rugby union fullbacks
1975 births
Living people
Worcester Warriors players
Rugby sevens players at the 2006 Commonwealth Games
Australia international rugby sevens players
Male rugby sevens players
Commonwealth Games rugby sevens players of Australia
Rugby union players from New South Wales